Winterton Community Academy (formerly Winterton Comprehensive School) is a coeducational secondary school with academy status, located in Winterton, North Lincolnshire, England.

Admissions
Winterton Community Academy offers GCSEs and BTECs as programmes of study for pupils.

History

Secondary modern
The school began as Winterton Secondary Modern School. Grammar school for Winterton was Scunthorpe Grammar School (now St Lawrence Academy, Scunthorpe, and previously High Ridge School).

Comprehensive
It became comprehensive with the rest of Scunthorpe in 1968. Previously a community school administered by North Lincolnshire Council, Winterton Comprehensive School converted to academy status on 1 October 2012 and was renamed Winterton Community Academy.

Notable former pupils

Winterton Secondary Modern School
 Liz Redfern, Baroness Redfern, Conservative Leader from 2006–07 and 2011-17 of North Lincolnshire Council

References

External links
Winterton Community Academy official website

Academies in the Borough of North Lincolnshire
Secondary schools in the Borough of North Lincolnshire
Winterton, Lincolnshire